A foreign minister or minister of foreign affairs (sometimes external affairs' minister) is generally a cabinet minister in charge of a nation's foreign policy and relations. There have been many women appointed to this post around the world. This list shows female foreign ministers from around the world, either from sovereign states, unrecognized states, autonomous regions, or sui generis entities. Some countries have varied titles for this particular position, such as minister for external affairs in Brazil and India. In United States and United Kingdom, the position is entitled as Secretary of State and Secretary of State for Foreign and Commonwealth Affairs respectively.

In some cases, the prime minister has concurrently served as foreign minister. This is the case with Indira Gandhi and Sirimavo Bandaranaike, who served as prime ministers of India and Ceylon respectively. Guinea-Bissau and Sweden have had seven female ministers, a world record.

Sovereign states

Italics denotes an acting foreign minister and states that are defunct.

Autonomous and constituent regions

Italics denotes an acting foreign minister and states that are defunct.

Sui generis entities

See also
Foreign minister
List of current foreign ministers
List of current Permanent Representatives to the United Nations

Notes

References

External links
Foreign Ministers
Rulers

 
 
Foreign
foreign ministers